In Athens, buildings are not allowed to surpass 12 floors so as not to block the view toward the Parthenon. Specifically up until 1968 the maximum allowed height of a building was 35 meters, but from 1985 until now it is 27 meters. There are several exceptions though, such as the Athens Towers, the Atrina center, and the OTE central building, all of which exceed that level. This is due to their either being built far away from the centre, or to the fact that they were constructed during periods of political instability. The city's tallest structure is the Athens Tower, reaching 103m and comprising 28 floors.

The list includes buildings above  in Athens area:

See also 
 List of tallest buildings and structures in Greece

Sources and external links 

 Report for Athens at Emporis
 Report for Athens at SkyscraperPage
 Report for Athens at Structurae